is a Japanese manga author known for the long-running series Hajime no Ippo. Born in Tokyo, Morikawa was inspired to become a manga artist upon reading Tetsuya Chiba's Harris no Kaze in elementary school.

He was previously an assistant to Shuichi Shigeno, while known mangaka Kentaro Miura and Kaori Saki were past assistants to him.

 Hajime no Ippo, as of March 2022, has released 134 tankōbon volumes. It has been adapted into several anime series, the first of which began airing in 2000 and was produced by Madhouse studio. The first series contains 76 episodes, while the second series, which started in 2009, contains 26. The third series, named Hajime no Ippo: Rising, was produced in 2013 and contains 25 episodes.

Morikawa won the Kodansha Manga Award in 1991 for Hajime no Ippo.

He is also the owner of JB Sports Gym in Tokyo.

Works 
 (1983)
 (1986) (2 volumes)
 (1986) (2 volumes)
 (1989-ongoing, Kodansha) (135 volumes)
 (2012) (1 volume)

References

External links 
 

1966 births
Manga artists from Tokyo
People from Tokyo
Living people